Andreas Komodikis (born 2 June 1997) is a footballer who plays as a midfielder or winger for PAEEK on loan from Doxa. Born in England, he is a youth international for Cyprus.

Career

At the age of 8, Komodikis joined the youth academy of English Premier League side Tottenham. In 2013, he joined the youth academy of QPR in the English second tier. In 2016, he signed for English sixth tier club St Albans City. In 2017, Komodikis signed for Doxa in the Cypriot top flight.

After that, he was sent on loan to Cypriot second tier team PAEEK. Before the second half of 2020–21, Komidikis was sent on loan to Karmiotissa in the Cypriot top flight, where he made 11 appearances and scored 0 goals. On 10 January 2021, he debuted for Karmiotissa during a 1–1 draw with Doxa.

References

External links
 

1997 births
ASIL Lysi players
Association football midfielders
Association football wingers
Cypriot expatriate footballers
Cypriot First Division players
Cypriot footballers
Cypriot Second Division players
Cyprus youth international footballers
Doxa Katokopias FC players
English footballers
English people of Cypriot descent
Footballers from Greater London
Karmiotissa FC players
Living people
PAEEK players